Salpausselkä is a ski jumping venue in Lahti, Finland. It forms part of a larger sports complex, which also includes the Lahti Ski Museum. The hills are K116, K90, K64, K38, K25, K15, K8 and K6.

References

External links 
 

Sport in Lahti
Ski jumping venues in Finland

pl:Salpausselkä